Secrets (stylized as SECRETS) is an American metalcore/post-hardcore band formed in San Diego, California in 2010. After being signed to Rise Records in 2011, Secrets released their debut full-length album The Ascent in January 2012. The record debuted at No. 3 on the Billboard Heatseekers Chart and became the first Velocity Records release to appear on the Billboard Top 200, debuting at No. 185.

After going through line-up changes in 2013, the band released their second album Fragile Figures in July. The album was a success, selling over 10,000 copies in the first month and charting at No. 59 on the Billboard 200 chart.

History

Formation and The Ascent (2010–2012)
Secrets was formed from ex-A City Serene members Xander Bourgeois, Marc Koch, Joe English, and Michael Sherman. However, the original lineup dispersed after they were involved in a serious car accident, which left one member in a coma. They reformed as Secrets in 2010 and added Richard Rogers as their clean vocalist and rhythm guitarist. The band was quickly signed to Rise Records imprint, Velocity Records. Though they initially planned to release an EP, the band went ahead with a full-length album, The Ascent (2012). This album was produced by Tom Denney, formerly of A Day to Remember.

Secrets then toured heavily to promote the release of The Ascent. They toured with bands such as Sleeping With Sirens, Attack Attack!, and Escape The Fate. They were also part of the Scream It Like You Mean It tour in 2012. During the middle of the tour, bassist Marc Koch left the band to focus on his schoolwork full-time.

Fragile Figures (2013–2014) 
On April 20, 2013, lead vocalist Xander Bourgeois announced that he would be leaving the band to focus on staying clean and sober. He also announced that he would be working on a new band that he feels will only succeed in his sobriety. He and Koch later formed a new band in late 2013, The Haven. On April 30, 2013, the band announced that their new vocalist would be Aaron Melzer, formerly of the local band Author and Finisher. Along with the vocalist announcement, the band shared a small clip of a new song off of their second album, which they recorded and released while on the Vans Warped Tour 2013.

On June 8, 2013, Secrets announced that Fragile Figures (2013) would be released on July 23, 2013. A new single, "Ready For Repair," was released alongside a music video on June 10. "Live Together, Die Alone," was released on June 25, 2013, as a promotional single. iTunes preorders for the new album went up on June 30, 2013. A new promotional single, "Maybe Next May," was released on July 5, 2013. On July 17, 2013, the album was released as an album stream on YouTube.

It was announced in late January 2014 that they would return on the Vans Warped Tour 2014 for a second time. A music video for "Maybe Next May" was released on April 7, 2014, featuring fan videos along with a band video.

Michael Owens announced via a Tumblr blog post that he has left the band on May 12, 2014.

On May 15, the band posted a previously unreleased demo, titled "Unreleased Song 2014," to YouTube  This track was later revealed to be an upcoming track on the deluxe edition of Fragile Figures, containing three new songs and a remix of the song "Ready for Repair". It was released on May 27, 2014.

Secrets has toured with Asking Alexandria, The Ghost Inside, and Crown the Empire on the Europe and UK From Death To Destiny Tour in October and November 2014. They toured with Dance Gavin Dance, Alive Like Me and Defeat the Low on The Rise Records Tour from November to December 2014.

Renditions EP and Everything That Got Us Here (2015–2016)
In mid-December, the band was announced as a supporting act for The Devil Wears Prada's upcoming Zombie 5 Tour, along with Born of Osiris and The Word Alive for the first leg of the tour. The second leg they will be joined by Sleepwave.

The band played several single, headlining shows during early 2015. At the same time, they announced they had begun working on their third album. The band played Self-Help Fest on March 7, 2015.

On March 19, 2015, the band announced they would release an acoustic EP, Renditions (2015), on April 7. The EP includes three stripped down songs from Fragile Figures as well as a new track, "What's Left of Us."

On October 3, 2015, the band announced via Facebook that Aaron Melzer would be leaving the band and that their new album was recorded with Wade Walters, who will also be touring with the band on their upcoming tour.

The band released a new single, Left Behind, on October 14, 2015, from their upcoming album Everything That Got Us Here (2015). The album was released on December 11, 2015, with two release shows scheduled for December 11 and 12, 2015 in Southern California. The music video for the album's second single, "Rise Up", was premiered on Billboard.com on November 10.

On May 30, 2016, the band released a surprise new track, "Waste Away".

Secrets (2017–2019)
In May 2017, the band signed to Made in the Shade records. On September 1, 2017, the band released a new single, "Incredible." The release was accompanied by a music video for the song.

On November 10, 2017, the band released an additional single, "Five Years," with an accompanying music video being released on December 8, 2017.

In addition, on December 8, 2017, the band announced that they will be releasing their self-titled album, Secrets on February 23, 2018. Prior to the release of the album Secrets released the music video for the song "Strangers" on February 16, 2018.

On March 8, 2018, Secrets released a statement that Michael Sherman would depart the band for personal reasons after being with the band for 8 years, leaving Richard Rogers as the last member from the original lineup.

On March 27, 2018, the music video for "Fourteen" was released followed by "Sixteen" on May 4, 2018. The band then released a music video for "The End" on April 26, 2019, making it the sixth music video from the album, and the first to feature drummer Connor Allen as a permanent member of the band.

Independent band (2019–2021)
Several singles were released between 2019 and 2021, including "My Mind, Myself & I," "Comedown," "Iron Hearted," and "Hold On." According to Richard Rogers, "My Mind, Myself & I" revolves around the topic of anxiety, fear, and panic. The official video for "Hold On" pays tribute to former unclean vocalist Aaron Melzer after passing away in 2020. Originally, Secrets planned to release a full-length album in 2020 with these singles; however, after Melzer's passing, they decided to record a new full-length album containing 10 songs with former producer Tom Denney.

Secrets announced their signing with San Diego label Velocity Records on February 4, 2021, after being an independent band since 2019.

Through February and March in 2022, Secrets played on the Velocity Records Tour headlined by Scary Kids Scaring Kids and D.R.U.G.S. On tour, they played two new songs from the upcoming album The Collapse, "Parasite" and "The Collapse."

The Collapse (2022–present) 
Secrets released their fifth full-length album The Collapse on June 10, 2022, through Velocity Records. It consists of 12 songs that go in a heavier metalcore direction compared to their previous releases. The album "covers topics of anxiety, depression, addiction, loss and hope" and was written both pre-pandemic and during the pandemic. "Parasite," "The Collapse," "Falling Out," and "Get Outta My Head" were released as singles. The closing track "Fade Away" focuses on the loss of a loved one and pays tribute to Aaron Melzer.

Band members
Current members
 Richard Rogers – clean vocals, rhythm guitar (2010–present)
 Wade Walters – unclean vocals (2015–present), rhythm guitar (2019–present), bass (2015–2019)
 Connor Branigan – lead guitar (2018–present), bass (2016–2018, 2019–present, as touring musician: 2014–2016), rhythm guitar (2016–2018, as touring musician: 2015–2016)
 Connor Allen – drums (2019–present)

Former members
 Marc Koch – bass (2010-2012)
 Xander Bourgeois – unclean vocals (2010-2013)
 Michael Owens – bass (2012-2014)
 Aaron Melzer – unclean vocals (2013-2015; died 2020)
 Joe English – drums, percussion (2010-2016)
 Michael Sherman – lead guitar (2010–2018)

Former touring musicians
 Tim Trad – bass (2014)
 Tyre Outerbridge – drums, percussion (2016–2018)

Timeline

Discography

Studio albums

EPs 
Renditions (2015)

Singles

Music videos

References 

Rise Records artists
Metalcore musical groups from California
American punk rock groups
Musical groups established in 2010